Beijing Normal University-Hong Kong Baptist University United International College (UIC), a public college located at Xiangzhou District, Zhuhai, Guangdong, China. It was co-founded by Beijing Normal University and Hong Kong Baptist University as the first full-scale cooperation in higher education between Chinese mainland and Hong Kong. Its charter has been approved by the Ministry of Education with support from local authorities.

UIC has its stated mission of "advancing the internationalization of Chinese higher education and taking the lead in implementing liberal arts education in China". English is the medium of instruction at UIC. The college has established the Divisions of Business and Management, Culture and Creativity, Humanities and Social Sciences, Science and Technology, in addition to the Graduate School. It offers 28 undergraduate programmes, and is approved to offer nine research and five taught postgraduate programmes for over 7,000 students. Undergraduates receive HKBU Bachelor's Degrees and UIC Graduation Certificates, and postgraduates earn HKBU degrees.

UIC established the Graduate School in 2017 and started to offer Postgraduate Programmes, including Taught Master Programmes in addition to Research Postgraduate Programmes that lead to MPhil or PhD degrees.

History
On 1 March 2003, The State Council of the People's Republic of China established the Regulations on Chinese-Foreign Cooperation in Running Schools. This provided for joint ventures to run schools coming from Hong Kong SAR, Macao SAR or Taiwan in concert with mainland educational institutions.

Prof Ng Ching-Fai, President and Vice-Chancellor of Hong Kong Baptist University, and Prof Zhong Binglin, President of Beijing Normal University, signed a cooperation agreement between the two universities to establish a higher education institution on 20 June 2003.

On 9 March 2004 Hong Kong Baptist University and Beijing Normal University signed an agreement to establish Beijing Normal University-Hong Kong Baptist University United International College (UIC) in Zhuhai, the first full-scale cooperation in higher education between mainland China and Hong Kong.

The Ministry of Education approved the establishment of UIC on 1 April 2005.

On 14 July 2006, UIC's first student exchange agreement was signed with Jeonju University, South Korea.

On 23 October 2006, the first phase of teaching buildings (B Zone and C Zone) were completed at the beginning of the semester.

The first High Table dinner took place, establishing a tradition at UIC On 7 April 2007.

UIC's Accounting Programme was accredited by CPA Australia on 3 September 2007.

In October 2007, UIC signed a Memorandum of Cooperation with seven US liberal arts universities of the Minnesota Private College Council (MPCC) to start long-term exchange and cooperation.

UIC launched teaching and administrative facilities at the Campus Inauguration Ceremony. The college logo is unveiled with the UIC Council's approval on 15 January 2008.

A panel from the University Grants Committee (Hong Kong) conducted an academic evaluation of UIC, before giving positive feedback on its teaching quality and innovative education during December 2008.

UIC became the first university in mainland China to be accredited for BBA (Hons) in Accounting by the Hong Kong Institute of Certified Public Accountants during May 2009.

The first cohort of UIC graduates received bachelor's degrees at the 50th Commencement of Hong Kong Baptist University on 7 November 2009.

Michael Suen, Secretary for Education of the Government of the Hong Kong SAR, paid a visit to UIC and praises its achievements on 4 January 2010.

Leung Chun-ying, Convener of the Executive Council of Hong Kong SAR, visits UIC and gave a Distinguished Lecture on "Integration of the Hong Kong Economy with the Pearl River Delta Region" on 17 February 2010.

On 24 June 2012, at its fourth Graduation Ceremony, UIC conferred the first Honorary Fellowships on four prominent individuals, who were distinguished contributors to the mission of UIC for their sustained commitment to the development of education and society.

UIC inaugurated the UIC Hengqin Research Development Centre and the Education Foundation in Hengqin New Area on 12 October 2013.

Between 27 and 29 April 2014, the UIC Orchestra performed in Poland by the Polish Cultural Exchange Foundation Chopin (Polska Fundacja Wymiany Kulturowej Chopin) in honor of the 65th anniversary of diplomatic relations between Poland and China.

Vice Mayor of Zhuhai Long Guangyan and UIC President Prof Ng Ching-Fai signed the Zhuhai Municipal People's Government and UIC Cooperation Agreement on 20 June 2014, which signaled the cooperation to construct a new campus.

UIC and the Pearl River Estuary Chinese White Dolphin Reserve built a base for teaching about the environment and for voluntary services on 21 November 2014.

A shadow theatre group from BNU-HKBU United International College was invited to perform at Shiu Pong College, the University of Macau (UM) on 21 March 2015.

A delegation from BNU-HKBU United International College was invited by the Associated Colleges of the South (ACS), a consortium of 16 liberal arts colleges in the US, to explore collaborative ties. UIC visited three of the ACS member institutions between 17 and 25 April 2015. The delegates discussed exchange opportunities and collaborative projects with Hendrix College, Trinity University, Davidson College and Birmingham-Southern College.

On April 26, 2015, a study group of students and teachers from the University of Alberta came to visit BNU-HKBU United International College and took part in a short-term study programme that lasted a fortnight.

Mr Eric Sautede, a Macau-based political commentator from France, was invited to UIC on 29 April 2015 by the International Journalism Programme to illustrate the socio-political context of satirical weekly magazine Charlie Hebdo. During his lecture, “Charlie Hebdo: Angels and/or Demons”, Mr Sautede recalled the terrorist attack in the magazine's Paris headquarters in January 2015. He also spoke of the hashtag slogan #jesuischarlie (French for "I am Charlie") that was adopted by Twitter followers.

Secretary for Education of Hong Kong Eddie Ng shared views on Hong Kong education and his life experience during his visit to UIC on 7 and 8 May 2015.

UIC student Lei Kaibin from the Culture, Creativity and Management Programme won the first place in the "Barthes / Vision Chine" photo competition that was announced on 10 May during the Festival Croisements 2015. Lei's photo stood out from the 398 entries and as a result his photo will be exhibited in various countries to commemorate French philosopher and critic Roland Gérard Barthes.

On May 13, 2015, UIC commenced its tenth anniversary celebration with students, alumni and staff by going on a hike. Over 700 people were divided up into groups and sent on three different routes where the final destination was the student's residency that is known as the "New Cultural Village", which is situated next to the waiting-to-be-built new campus site. Some groups hiked along a green lane, while others climbed over the mountains between the two campus sites, and one group reached the summit of the nearby Mount Phoenix.

On 27 June 2015 at the UIC 7th Graduation Ceremony, four prominent individuals in the fields of academia, media and literature were rewarded with the Honorary Fellowships. The receivers of the Honorary Fellowships were Prof Chang Hsin-Kang (Former President of City University of Hong Kong and former Chairman of the Cultural and Heritage Commission of Hong Kong), Liu Changle (Chairman and Chief Executive Officer of Phoenix Satellite Television Holdings Limited), Dr Paul C Pribbenow (Augsburg College's President), as well as famous writer and former Minister of Culture of China Wang Meng.

The first phase of the construction of UIC's new campus began in 2015 after one year of preparation since the ground-breaking ceremony on 20 June 2014.

Beijing Normal University-Hong Kong Baptist University United International College signed a memorandum of understanding (Mou) with Oberlin College at the 8th Sino-American liberal Arts Forum on 19 November 2015. Also during this forum, UIC signed a memorandum of understanding and an exchange agreement with Hendrix College.

UIC hosted the 2015 IEEE-TALE (The Institute of Electrical and Electronics Engineers international conference on Teaching, Assessment and Learning for Engineering) event from 10 December until 12 December.

On 12 December 2015, UIC unveiled its new motto, "In knowledge and in deeds, unto the whole person". In addition, the UIC Choir presented the premiere of the college anthem.

UIC announced that it had established a fourth division to its academic programs. The Senate of Hong Kong Baptist University had approved the establishment of the "Division of Culture and Creativity (DCC)" at its 1st meeting. The division will be ready for the 2016 to 2017 academic year.

On 16 March 2016, UIC hosted the first symposium about English language teaching and learning. Nine speakers were invited to this academic exchange platform which was themed "Innovative approaches and challenges in enhancing English proficiency among Chinese students at tertiary level". They were from Sino-foreign universities in China, i.e. Duke Kunshan University, New York University Shanghai, The University of Nottingham Ningbo China, Wenzhou-Kean University, Xi'an Jiaotong-Liverpool University and UIC, as well as Sun Yat-sen University and Hong Kong Baptist University.

UIC has renewed the funding of the University Innovation and Enhancement Project with a grant of 750,000 yuan (approximately US$115,768) for 2016, approved by the Department of Education of Guangdong Province. The amount of funding has increased by 23.4% compared with 2015.

The University of Westminster and UIC signed an exchange agreement on 3 June 2016. During the 2016–2017 academic year, UIC students can apply to study at Westminster School of Media, Arts and Design (WSMAD) as well as Westminster Business School (WBS) for one semester.

After recently receiving approval from the Ministry of Education, UIC will officially offer Research Postgraduate Programmes leading to MPhil or PhD degrees as well as Taught Master Programmes during the 2016–17 academic year.

On 28 September 2016, UIC launched the Zhuhai Key Laboratory of Agricultural Product Quality and Food.

On 19 October 2016, UIC and China Unicom Zhuhai signed a collaborative agreement on establishing a big data laboratory.

On 9 December 2016, The Institute for Communication Studies of Chinese Culture at UIC was established.

On 16 June 2017, The 9th Graduation Ceremony and Honorary Fellowship Conferment took place at the University Hall on the new campus for the first time.

On 18 September 2017, new students were officially welcomed at their Inauguration Ceremony. This was the first semester that all UIC students will attend classes at the new campus.

On 9 December 2017, UIC celebrated the New Campus Inauguration and launched the Graduate School and more facilities.

On 23 May 2018, the New Campus Carnival was held to celebrate the opening of many new facilities, including the new Learning Resource Centre, the new Staff and Student Activities Centre, the Maker Centre and more. The UIC Yayue (Chinese court music) Orchestra and a Kayak Relay Race on Central Lake also had their official openings.

On 26 September 2018, UIC received the first intake of 30 students of its taught master's programmes, including students from Master of Arts in Communication and from Master of Professional Accountancy.

On 5 December 2018, UIC unveiled the Zhong You Agri-Brand Research Institute, the Academy of Global Affairs, the UIC Food Safety Testing Centre and more during the symposium on contributing to the development of Guangdong-Hong Kong-Macao Greater Bay Area.

On 24 January 2019, UIC launched the Arts Hill at the new campus, which comprises a Shedao (Chinese archery) house and Guqin classrooms.

In February 2019, founding President Professor Ng Ching-Fai retired. Professor Tang Tao was appointed as the new President.

In December 2019, UIC is listed as a Chinese traditional culture inheritance base amongst Guangdong universities and the only base amongst Zhuhai universities by the provincial Department of Education for the College’s Lingnan rite and music programmes.

In March 2020, UIC launches the Sports Park, giving staff and students a new outdoor athletic facility.

On 30 June 2020, Zhuhai Municipal People's Government and UIC sign a cooperation agreement, granting UIC another plot of land of approximately 367,000 square metres to build its second-phase campus.

In October 2020, UIC launches a series of lectures and other events to celebrate its 15th anniversary.

On 23 May 2021, UIC holds the second-phase campus groundbreaking ceremony.

Academic programs

Division of Business and Management 

 Accounting
 Applied Economics
 e-Business Management and Information Systems
 Entrepreneurship and Innovation
 Finance 
 Management of Human Resources 
 Marketing Management

Division of Culture and Creativity 
 Cinema and Television 
 Culture, Creativity and Management
 Media Arts and Design
Music Performance

Division of Humanities and Social Sciences 

 Applied Translation Studies
 English Language and Literature Studies
 Government and International Relations
 Globalisation and Development
 International Journalism
 Public Relations and Advertising
 Social Work and Social Administration

Division of Science and Technology 

 Applied Psychology
 Computer Science and Technology
 Data Science
 Environmental Science
 Financial Mathematics
 Food Science and Technology 
 Statistics

References

External links
United International College 
BNU-HKBU United International College's LinkedIn Page
BNU-HKBU United International College's Facebook Page
BNU-HKBU United International College's Weibo Page
BNU-HKBU United International College's YouTube Channel

Educational institutions established in 2005
Universities and colleges in Guangdong
2005 establishments in China